Matheus Barbosa Teixeira (born 18 August 1994), known as Matheus Barbosa, is a Brazilian footballer who plays as a centre midfielder for Guarani.

Club career
Born in São Bernardo do Campo, Barbosa is a graduate of the youth academy of Grêmio and made his professional debut in the 2014 Campeonato Gaúcho, playing two times in the competition. On 2 February, he was loaned out to ABC for the 2014 Campeonato Potiguar. He went on to make seven appearances for the side and returned to his parent club in May. After a short stint with Botafogo SP, Barbosa was loaned out to América RN on 5 May 2015 for the remainder of the season.

In 2016, Barbosa signed with Atlético Tubarão and went on to make 17 appearances with the club in the second tier of Campeonato Catarinense. On 23 March 2018, he joined Avaí on a loan deal. Following the side's promotion to Série A, his contract was renewed for one year in December.

International career
Barbosa has been at the under-17 level and has won the 2011 Copa Sudamericano Under-17 with the side.

Club statistics

Honours
Avaí
Campeonato Catarinense: 2019

References

External links

1994 births
Living people
Association football midfielders
Brazilian footballers
Grêmio Foot-Ball Porto Alegrense players
ABC Futebol Clube players
Botafogo Futebol Clube (SP) players
América Futebol Clube (RN) players
Paulista Futebol Clube players
Clube Atlético Tubarão players
Avaí FC players
Cuiabá Esporte Clube players
Cruzeiro Esporte Clube players
Atlético Clube Goianiense players
CR Vasco da Gama players
Guarani FC players
Campeonato Brasileiro Série A players
Campeonato Brasileiro Série B players
Campeonato Brasileiro Série C players
People from São Bernardo do Campo
Footballers from São Paulo (state)